Phil Collier (December 7, 1925 – February 24, 2001) was a sports writer who worked in the San Diego area for many years.

Collier began his career as a sportswriter in Baytown, Texas in 1939. After a military service and a stint at Texas Christian University, he joined the Fort Worth Star-Telegram.

In San Diego, Collier covered the Pacific Coast League San Diego Padres until the Brooklyn Dodgers moved to Los Angeles. For the next decade, he covered both Dodgers and Los Angeles Angels games for the San Diego Union. Collier was the sportswriter who Sandy Koufax called to inform the world of his sudden retirement.

When San Diego was awarded the San Diego Padres, Collier began covering the team, which he would do for 18 seasons. In 1987, Collier became the national baseball columnist for the Union. He continued to write for the Union-Tribune after its merger with the San Diego Tribune in 1992. He retired from the paper in 1996.

He was awarded the J. G. Taylor Spink Award in 1991, was inducted into the writers section of the Baseball Hall of Fame.

He was born in Stanton, Texas and died in San Diego, California of prostate cancer.

References

External links
Baseball Hall of Fame

1925 births
2001 deaths
Sportswriters from California
Sportswriters from Texas
Baseball writers
BBWAA Career Excellence Award recipients
Deaths from prostate cancer
Deaths from cancer in California
People from San Diego
People from Stanton, Texas